Philip Dormer Stanhope, 4th Earl of Chesterfield,  (22 September 169424 March 1773) was a British statesman, diplomat, and man of letters, and an acclaimed wit of his time.

Early life
He was born in London to Philip Stanhope, 3rd Earl of Chesterfield, and Lady Elizabeth Savile, and known as Lord Stanhope until the death of his father, in 1726. Following the death of his mother in 1708, Stanhope was raised mainly by his grandmother, the Marchioness of Halifax. Educated at Trinity Hall, Cambridge, he left just over a year into his studies, after focusing on languages and oration. He subsequently embarked on the Grand Tour of the Continent, to complete his education as a nobleman, by exposure to the cultural legacies of Classical antiquity and the Renaissance, and to become acquainted with his aristocratic counterparts and the polite society of Continental Europe.

In the course of his post-graduate tour of Europe, the death of Queen Anne (r. 1702–1714) and the accession of King George I (r. 1714–1727) to the throne opened a political career for Stanhope, and he quickly returned to England. A member of the Whig party, Philip Stanhope entered government service as a courtier to the King, through the mentorship of his relative, James Stanhope, (later 1st Earl Stanhope), the King's favourite minister, who procured his appointment as Lord of the Bedchamber to the Prince of Wales, George II.

Political career
In 1715, Philip Dormer Stanhope entered the House of Commons as Lord Stanhope of Shelford and as member for St Germans. Later, when the impeachment of James Butler, 2nd Duke of Ormonde came before the House, he used the occasion (5 August 1715) to try out the result of his rhetorical studies. His maiden speech was fluent and dogmatic, but upon its conclusion, another member, after first complimenting the speech, reminded the young orator that he was still six weeks short of his age of majority and consequently liable to a fine of £500 for speaking in the House. Lord Stanhope left the House of Commons with a low bow and set out for the Continent.

While in Paris, he sent the government valuable information about the developing Jacobite plot, and in 1716, he returned to Britain, resumed his seat and became known as a skilled yet tactful debater. When King George I quarrelled with his son, the Prince of Wales (George II) the same year, Lord Stanhope remained politically faithful to the Prince but was careful not to break with the King's party. However, his continued friendly correspondence with the Prince's mistress, Henrietta Howard, later Countess of Suffolk, earned Chesterfield the personal hatred of the Prince's wife, Princess Caroline of Ansbach. In 1723, he was voted Captain of the Gentlemen Pensioners. In January 1725, on the revival of the Order of the Bath, the red ribbon was offered to him, but Chesterfield declined the honour.

Upon his father's death in 1726, Lord Stanhope assumed his seat in the House of Lords and became the 4th Earl of Chesterfield. The new Lord Chesterfield's inclination towards oration, often seen as ineffective in the House of Commons because of its polish and lack of force, was met with appreciation in the House of Lords, and won many to his side. In 1728, under service to the new king, George II, Chesterfield was sent to the Hague as ambassador, where his gentle tact and linguistic dexterity served him well. As a reward for his diplomatic service, Chesterfield received the Order of the Garter in 1730, the position of Lord Steward, and the friendship of Robert Walpole. While a British envoy in the Hague, he helped negotiate the second Treaty of Vienna (1731), which signaled the collapse of the Anglo-French Alliance, and the beginning of the Anglo-Austrian Alliance. In 1732, Madelina Elizabeth du Bouchet, a French governess, gave birth to his illegitimate son, Philip for whose advice on life Chesterfield wrote the Letters to his Son. By the end of 1732, ill health and financial troubles led to Chesterfield's return to Britain and his resignation as ambassador In 1731, while at The Hague, Chesterfield initiated the Grand Duke of Tuscany (later to become Francis I, Holy Roman Emperor) from the House of Habsburg-Lorraine into Freemasonry, which was at the time being used as an intelligence network by the British Whigs.

In 1733, Lord Chesterfield married Melusina von der Schulenberg, the Countess of Walsingham, who was the illegitimate daughter of the late King George I and his mistress, the Duchess of Kendal. After recuperating from his illness, Chesterfield resumed his seat in the House of Lords, of which he was now one of the acknowledged leaders. He supported the ministry and leadership of Robert Walpole, the de facto prime minister but withheld the blind fealty that Walpole preferred of his followers. Lord Chesterfield strongly opposed the Excise Bill, the Whig Party leader's favourite measure, in the House of Lords, and his brothers argued against it in the House of Commons. Even though Walpole eventually succumbed to the political fury and abandoned the measure, Chesterfield was summarily dismissed from his stewardship. For the next two years, he led the opposition in the Upper House to effect Walpole's downfall. During that time, he resided in Grosvenor Square and got involved in the creation of a new London charity called the Foundling Hospital for which he was a founding governor.

In 1741, he signed the protest for Walpole's dismissal and went abroad on account of his health; after visiting Voltaire in Brussels, Lord Chesterfield went to Paris where he associated with writers and men of letters, including Crebillon the Younger, Fontenelle and Montesquieu. In 1742, Walpole's fall from political power was complete, but although he and his administration had been overthrown in no small part by Chesterfield's efforts, the new ministry did not count Chesterfield either in its ranks or among its supporters. He remained in opposition and distinguished himself by the courtly bitterness of his attacks on King George II, who learned to hate him violently.

In 1743, Chesterfield began writing under the name of "Jeffrey Broadbottom" for pamphlets and a new journal, Old England; or, the Constitutional Journal, which appeared with quick circulation (broad bottom being a term for a government with cross-party appeal). A number of pamphlets, in some of which Chesterfield had the help of Edmund Waller, followed. His energetic campaign against George II and his government won the gratitude of the Dowager Duchess of Marlborough, who left him £20,000 as a mark of her appreciation. In 1744, the King was compelled to abandon Lord Carteret, the successor to Walpole, and the coalition for a "Broad Bottom" party, led by Chesterfield and Pitt, came into office in coalition with the Pelhams.

In the troubled state of European politics, the Earl's calm conduct and diplomatic experience were more useful abroad than at home, and he was sent to The Hague as ambassador for a second time. The object of his mission this time was to persuade the Dutch to join in the War of the Austrian Succession and to arrange the details of their assistance. Success was quickly achieved, and on his return a few weeks afterwards, he received the Lord-Lieutenancy of Ireland, which he had long coveted.

Lord Chesterfield's short administration (January 1745 – November 1746) in Ireland was effective, as he repressed the corruption traditional to the office, and established schools and factories. He was the first official to allow Dubliners to roam in the Phoenix Park, and installed the central "Phoenix Monument", a phoenix bird on a Corinthian column (the 2.8 mi main road through the park is still known as Chesterfield Avenue). He worked with and pacified both the Protestant Orange Order and Roman Catholic Jacobite factions; as a result, Irish Jacobites did not assist the Jacobite rising of 1745. Anecdotally, upon being roused for a false alarm of an Irish rebellion and being told that "the papists in Ireland are all up!", he replied: "I am not surprised at it, why, it is ten o'clock, I should have been up too, had I not overslept myself".

In 1746, however, he had to exchange the Lord-Lieutenancy for Secretary of State. Chesterfield had hoped to retain a hold over the King through the influence of Lady Yarmouth, the mistress of George II, but John Montagu (4th Earl of Sandwich) and Thomas Pelham-Holles (1st Duke of Newcastle) combined forces against him, and in 1748, he resigned the seals and returned to his books and playing cards with the admirable composure that was one of his most striking characteristics. Despite his denials, Lord Chesterfield is speculated to have at least helped to write Apology for a late Resignation, in a Letter from an English Gentleman to his Friend at The Hague, which ran for four editions in 1748.

Later years
While continuing to attend and participate in the Upper House's proceedings, Lord Chesterfield turned down the dukedom offered him by George II, whose wrath had melted in the face of Chesterfield's diplomacy and rhetoric. In 1751, seconded by George Parker, 2nd Earl of Macclesfield, the president of the Royal Society, and the mathematician James Bradley, Chesterfield greatly distinguished himself in the debates on establishing a definitive calendar for Britain and the Commonwealth. With the Calendar (New Style) Act 1750, he successfully established the Gregorian calendar and a calendar year that began on 1 January for the British realm. Informally, the calendar act also is known as the "Chesterfield's Act". He started gradually to withdraw from both politics and society because of his growing deafness.

In 1755, he and Samuel Johnson had a dispute over A Dictionary of the English Language. Eight years previously (1747), Johnson had sent Secretary of State Chesterfield an outline of his Dictionary, along with a business offer for such; Chesterfield agreed and invested £10. Although Chesterfield wrote two anonymous articles for World magazine shortly before the dictionary's publication that praised both Johnson's exhaustive editorial work and the comprehensive dictionary itself, Johnson was disappointed at the lack of interest in the project from Lord Chesterfield during its compilation. Upset with what he saw as a lack of support from an avowed man of letters and patron of literature, Johnson wrote the Letter to Chesterfield, which dealt with the dynamics of the patron–artist relation. Chesterfield was not offended by the letter but instead impressed by the language. After receiving it, he displayed it on a table for visitors to read and, according to Robert Dodsley, said "This man has great powers" and then he "pointed out the severest passages, and observed how well they were expressed". Adams told Johnson what was said, and Johnson responded, "That is not Lord Chesterfield; he is the proudest man this day". Adams responded, "No, there is one person at least as proud; I think, by your own account, you are the prouder man of the two". Johnson, finishing, said, "But mine, was defensive pride".

In the 1760s, Chesterfield offered a cogent critique of the Stamp Act 1765 passed by George Grenville's parliament. In a letter to his friend, the Duke of Newcastle, Chesterfield noted the absurdity of the Stamp Act because it could not be properly enforced, but if effective, the Act would generate a revenue no greater than £8000 per year, but the annual cost of reduced trade from the American colonies would be about £1,000,000.

Letters to His Son 

Eugenia Stanhope, the impoverished widow of Chesterfield's illegitimate son, Philip Stanhope, was the first to publish the book Letters to His Son on the Art of Becoming a Man of the World and a Gentleman (1774), which comprises a thirty-year correspondence in more than 400 letters. Begun in 1737 and continued until the death of his son in 1768, Chesterfield wrote mostly instructive communications about geography, history, and classical literature, with later letters focusing on politics and diplomacy, and the letters themselves were written in French, English and Latin to refine his son's grasp of the languages.

As a handbook for worldly success in the 18th century, the Letters to His Son give perceptive and nuanced advice for how a gentleman should interpret the social codes that are manners:

... However frivolous a company may be, still, while you are among them, do not show them, by your inattention, that you think them so; but rather take their tone, and conform in some degree to their weakness, instead of manifesting your contempt for them. There is nothing that people bear more impatiently, or forgive less, than contempt; and an injury is much sooner forgotten than an insult. If, therefore, you would rather please than offend, rather be well than ill spoken of, rather be loved than hated; remember to have that constant attention about you which flatters every man's little vanity; and the want of which, by mortifying his pride, never fails to excite his resentment, or at least his ill will....

Samuel Johnson said of the letters that "they teach the morals of a whore, and the manners of a dancing-master" as means for getting on in the world as a gentleman.

Despite having been an accomplished essayist and epigrammatist in his time, Lord Chesterfield's literary reputation today derives almost entirely from Letters to His Son on the Art of Becoming a Man of the World and a Gentleman (1774) and Letters to His Godson (1890), books of private correspondence and paternal and avuncular advice that he never intended for publication.

Need for legitimate heir

In 1768 Chesterfield's beloved but illegitimate son, Philip Stanhope, died in France of dropsy, which left behind his widow, Eugenia Stanhope and their two illegitimate sons, Charles and Philip. Despite his short life, the privileged education provided by his father, Lord Chesterfield, allowed Philip an honourable career in the diplomatic service of Britain, despite being handicapped as a nobleman's illegitimate son. The grieving Chesterfield was disappointed to learn that Philip's long and mostly secret-relationship (they married the year before his death) had been to Eugenia, a woman of a humble social class since that was a topic that he had covered at length in the Letters to his Son. However, Lord Chesterfield bequeathed an annuity of £100 to each of his grandsons, Charles Stanhope (1761–1845) and Philip Stanhope (1763–1801), and a further £10,000 for them both but left no pension for his widowed daughter-in-law, Eugenia. It was that lack of funds that led to Eugenia to sell the Letters to his Son to a publisher.

Left without a legitimate heir to his lands and property (he and his wife, Melusina von der Schulenburg had no children together) Lord Chesterfield acted to protect his hereditary interests by adopting his distant cousin and godson, Philip Stanhope (1755–1815), as his heir and successor to the title Earl of Chesterfield.

Death 
The 4th Earl of Chesterfield (Philip Dormer Stanhope) died on 24 March 1773, at Chesterfield House, Westminster, his London townhouse (built about 1749). His godson and adopted heir then became Philip Stanhope, 5th Earl of Chesterfield.

Legacy

In literature 
Decades after his death, Lord Chesterfield appears as a character in William Makepeace Thackeray's novel The Virginians (1857). He is also mentioned in Charles Dickens' novel Barnaby Rudge (1841), wherein the foppish Sir John Chester says that Lord Chesterfield is the finest English writer:

Shakespeare was undoubtedly very fine in his way; Milton good, though prosy; Lord Bacon deep, and decidedly knowing; but the writer who should be his country's pride, is my Lord Chesterfield.

Places 
In the UK, Chesterfield gave his name to Chesterfield Street, Mayfair, London, which runs from Curzon Street, site of the former Chesterfield House; in the US, his name has been given to Chesterfield County, Virginia, and Chesterfield County, South Carolina.

Furniture 
The first leather Chesterfield sofa, with its distinctive deep buttoned, quilted leather upholstery and lower seat base, is believed to have been commissioned by this Lord Chesterfield. Consequently, in the UK, the word chesterfield now describes a deep buttoned sofa, usually made from leather, with arms and back of the same height. In Canada, chesterfield used to be the predominant term for any type of couch, but has been decreasing in popularity among the younger generations.

Other 
Chesterfield cigarettes were named after Chesterfield County, Virginia, which was itself named for Lord Chesterfield.

Vincent La Chapelle, a French master cook, wrote The Modern Cook while in the employ of Lord Chesterfield, and lived abroad with him in The Hague during his ambassador years. After leaving Chesterfield's service, La Chapelle went on to cook for – among others – William IV, Prince of Orange, John V of Portugal, and Madame de Pompadour (mistress of Louis XV of France).

Chesterfield coats, for both men and women, are woolen overcoats with velvet on the collar, an elegant touch.

D. G. Yuengling & Son of Pottsville, Pennsylvania, produces a beer named Lord Chesterfield Ale after the 4th Earl of Chesterfield. There is also a Chesterfield Road in Pittsburgh, formerly known for its punk subculture.

Further reading
The Stanhope Legacy: The Story of Lord Chesterfield's Grandsons and the Miserable Fate of their Heirs; Cheryl Nicol

References

External links
 Philip Dormer Stanhope, 4th Earl of Chesterfield at the Eighteenth-Century Poetry Archive (ECPA)
 
 
 
 
 Letters of Philip Dormer Stanhope, Earl of Chesterfield, edited by Lord Mahon:Volume 2, 3. 4 (in duplicate); London; Richard Bentley 1847
 Scans of Stanhope's Letters to his son, 1774–1775 edition, Vol. 1, Vol. 2
 Guide to the Chesterfield Manuscripts at the Lilly Library, Indiana University
 Chesterfield sofa, the true story of the Count of Chester. 
 Letters to his Son from Project Gutenberg via Penn State University
 Guide to the Diplomatic Papers of Philip Dormer Stanhope, 4th Earl of Chesterfield, 1720–1748, The Bancroft Library

British Secretaries of State
Members of the Privy Council of Great Britain
English letter writers
English non-fiction writers
Knights of the Garter
Diplomatic peers
Literary peers
1694 births
1773 deaths
Members of the Parliament of Great Britain for constituencies in Cornwall
British MPs 1715–1722
British MPs 1722–1727
Whig (British political party) MPs for English constituencies
Ambassadors of Great Britain to the Netherlands
Philip
English male non-fiction writers
Earls of Chesterfield
Freemasons of the Premier Grand Lodge of England
Lords Lieutenant of Ireland
Leaders of the House of Lords
Montesquieu